Cardston was a territorial electoral district for the Legislative Assembly of Northwest Territories, Canada.

The riding was only contested once, in 1902, prior to the formation of the Province of Alberta in 1905.

Members of the Legislative Assembly (MLAs) 
John William Woolf served from 1902 to 1905, being the district's only representative.

Election results

1902 election

See also
Cardston Alberta provincial electoral district.

References

External links 
Website of the Legislative Assembly of Northwest Territories

Former electoral districts of Northwest Territories
Cardston